Shuiyang River() is a tributary on the southern bank of the Yangtze River, one of the principal rivers in Anhui Province.

References

Rivers of Anhui
Tributaries of the Yangtze River